The Men's 3,000 metres Steeplechase event at the 2005 World Championships in Athletics was held on August 7 and August 9 at the Helsinki Olympic Stadium. The first three of each heat (Q) plus the six fastest times (q) qualified for the final.

Medalists

Schedule
All times are Eastern European Time (UTC+2)

Abbreviations
All results shown are in minutes

Startlist

Results

Heat 1
  Saif Saaeed Shaheen, Qatar 8:11.79 Q
  Ezekiel Kemboi, Kenya 8:11.90 Q
  Simon Vroemen, Netherlands 8:13.08 Q (SB)
  Günther Weidlinger, Austria 8:15.91 q
  Luis Miguel Martín, Spain 8:17.47 q
  Mustafa Mohamed, Sweden 8:18.18 q
  Gaël Pencreach, France 8:23.96
  Radosław Popławski, Poland 8:29.85
  Ion Luchianov, Moldova 8:32.09 (SB)
  Steve Slattery, United States 8:36.01
  Alexander Greaux, Puerto Rico 8:39.91
  Boštjan Buc, Slovenia 8:40.81
  Pieter Desmet, Belgium 8:48.05

Heat 2
  Paul Kipsiele Koech, Kenya 8:16.42 Q
  Musa Amer Obaid, Qatar 8:16.53 Q
  Antonio David Jiménez, Spain 8:16.72 Q
  Bouabdellah Tahri, France 8:18.31 q
  Tareq Mubarak Taher, Bahrain 8:21.68 q
  Anthony Famiglietti, United States 8:21.84
  Jukka Keskisalo, Finland 8:25.14 (SB)
  Tewodros Shiferaw, Ethiopia 8:27.06 (SB)
  Hamid Ezzine, Morocco 8:27.07
  Yoshitaka Iwamizu, Japan 8:28.73
  Peter Nowill, Australia 8:35.35
  Andrey Olshanskiy, Russia 8:54.04
  Jakub Czaja, Poland DNF

Heat 3
  Brahim Boulami, Morocco 8:19.54 Q
  Brimin Kipruto, Kenya 8:19.90 Q
  José Luis Blanco, Spain 8:21.04 Q (SB)
  Daniel Lincoln, United States  8:21.39 q
  Halil Akkaş, Turkey 8:26.35
  Ruben Ramolefi, South Africa 8:28.12
  Krijn van Koolwijk, Belgium  8:28.92
  Vincent Le Dauphin, France 8:30.42
  Moustafa Ahmed Shebto, Qatar 8:33.00 (SB)
  Martin Pröll, Austria 8:33.70
  Vadym Slobodenyuk, Ukraine 8:35.73
  Roman Usov, Russia 8:36.30
  Andrew Lemoncello, Great Britain 8:40.29
  Matthew Kerr, Canada 8:41.20

Final
  Saif Saaeed Shaheen, Qatar 8:13.31
  Ezekiel Kemboi, Kenya 8:14.95
  Brimin Kipruto, Kenya 8:15.30
  Brahim Boulami, Morocco 8:15.32
  Simon Vroemen, Netherlands 8:16.76
  Antonio David Jiménez, Spain 8:17.69
  Paul Kipsiele Koech, Kenya 8:19.14
  Bouabdellah Tahri, France 8:19.96
  Musa Amer Obaid, Qatar 8:20.22
  Mustafa Mohamed, Sweden 8:20.26
  Luis Miguel Martín, Spain 8:22.13
  Günther Weidlinger, Austria 8:22.84
  Daniel Lincoln, United States 8:23.89
  José Luis Blanco, Spain 8:24.62
  Tareq Mubarak Taher, Bahrain 8:37.62

External links
IAAF results (heats)
IAAF results (final)
todor66

3000 steeplechase
Steeplechase at the World Athletics Championships